Thomas Reynolds (also "Reynold" or "Raynolds") (died c.1560) was an English bishop and academic. He was the Warden of Merton College, Oxford, from 1545 and was created Bishop of Hereford by Mary I.

Life
A cleric of the reformed Church of England under Edward VI, after the Restoration he was a chaplain to Queen Mary, who gave him preferment and created him Dean of Exeter in 1555. He also served as Vice-Chancellor of the University of Oxford. On the accession of Elizabeth I, the formalities for his post as bishop were not yet complete and he was deprived. He died in the Marshalsea Prison.

Reynolds was the uncle of John Reynolds and William Reynolds, of a family near Pinhoe, Devon. Adam Hamilton has argued for a relationship to Richard Reynolds, and incidentally for an identification of Thomas Reynolds as a Catholic at an earlier period of his life.

References

Year of birth missing
1560 deaths
Bishops of Hereford
Deans of Exeter
Wardens of Merton College, Oxford
Vice-Chancellors of the University of Oxford
English people who died in prison custody
English chaplains
16th-century English bishops